Ugo Pugliese (born 26 November 1961) is an Italian politician.

He is a member of the centrist party Union of the Centre and was elected Mayor of Crotone at the 2016 Italian local elections. He took office on 25 June 2016.

He was elected President of the Province of Crotone on 19 April 2018.

Pugliese resigned on 11 November 2019 and left both offices on 4 December 2019.

See also
2016 Italian local elections
List of mayors of Crotone

References

External links
 

1961 births
Living people
People from Crotone
Mayors of Crotone
Presidents of the Province of Crotone
Union of the Centre (2002) politicians